Novo Selo is a village in the municipality of Bogovinje, North Macedonia.

Demographics
As of the 2021 census, Novo Selo had 877 residents with the following ethnic composition:
Albanians 662
Persons for whom data are taken from administrative sources 214
Others 1

According to the 2002 census, the village had a total of 1,589 inhabitants. Ethnic groups in the village include:

Albanians 1,579
Macedonians 1
Others 9

References

External links

Villages in Bogovinje Municipality
Albanian communities in North Macedonia